Schwandt is a surname. Notable people with the surname include:

Erich Schwandt (1935–2017), Canadian musician
Rhonda Schwandt, American gymnast
Wilbur Schwandt (1904–1988), American musician

See also 
Schwand (disambiguation)